The bodybuilding events  at the 2001 World Games in Akita was played between 18 and 19 August. 55 athletes, from 22 nations, participated in the tournament. The competition took place in Akita City Culture Hall.

Participating nations

Medal table

Events

Men

Women

References

External links
 International Federation of Bodybuilding and Fitness
 Bodybuilding on IWGA website
 Results

 
2001 World Games
2001